Jorge Jiménez (born 30 September 1967 in San Salvador), is an athlete from El Salvador who competes in compound archery. He won the Archery World Cup in 2007, and achieved number one ranking status in the same year.

In 2013, he represented El Salvador at the 2013 World Games in Cali, Colombia.

References

1967 births
Living people
Salvadoran male archers
World Archery Championships medalists
Central American and Caribbean Games gold medalists for El Salvador
Central American and Caribbean Games silver medalists for El Salvador
Central American and Caribbean Games bronze medalists for El Salvador
Competitors at the 2006 Central American and Caribbean Games
Competitors at the 2010 Central American and Caribbean Games
Central American and Caribbean Games medalists in archery
Competitors at the 2013 World Games
21st-century Salvadoran people